The Tigers militia (transliterated: Numūr or Al-Noumour), also known as NLP Tigers ( | Numur al-Ahrar) or PNL "Lionceaux" in French, was the military wing of the National Liberal Party (NLP) during the Lebanese Civil War between 1975 and 1980.

Origins 
The NLP militia was first raised in October 1968 by the za'im (political boss) and former President of Lebanon Camille Chamoun at his own home town of Es-Sa'adiyat, originally under the title Brigade of the Lebanese Tigers – BLT ( | Katibat al-Numur al-Lubnaniyya) or Brigade des Lionceaux Libanais (BLL) in French, allegedly taken from his middle name, Nimr – meaning "Tiger" in Arabic. Initially just 500 men strong, the BLT was organized, trained, and led by the "defence secretary" of the NLP, Naim Berdkan; after his death in action in January 1976, he was succeeded by Dany Chamoun, Camille Chamoun's younger son.

Initially allocated in the NLP party offices' at Sodeco Square in the Nasra (Nazareth) neighbourhood of the Achrafieh quarter in Beirut, the Tigers' military HQ was relocated in 1978 to Safra, a boat marina and tourist beach resort located 25 km north of the Lebanese capital in the Keserwan District, where it remained until the militia's dissolution.

Structure and organization 
Under the command of Dany Chamoun, the Tigers had become by 1978 the second largest force in the Christian Lebanese Front, and although the Chamouns never achieved with their own militia the same level of organizational efficiency displayed by the rival Phalange' Kataeb Regulatory Forces militia, they were nonetheless capable of aligning 3,500 men and women, though other sources list a total of 4,000, which included civilian recruits and deserters from the Lebanese Army. However, some unconfirmed sources advance an even higher number, about 15,000. Their 500 full-time fighters and 3,000 part-time reservists were organized into armoured, 'commando', infantry, artillery, signals, medical, logistics and military police branches. The Tigers' own chain of command was predominantly Maronite, though the rank-and-file were drawn from the 150,000 Maronite, Greek-Orthodox, Druze and Shi'ite militants of the NLP and trained in-country at clandestine facilities; first set up by the NLP in 1966 these training centres were located at Naas in the Matn District, Es-Saadiyat in the Iqlim al-Kharrub coastal enclave south of Beirut and at Adma in the northern mountainous Keserwan District.

NLP militia units operated mainly in East Beirut, the Byblos, Matn and Keserwan Districts and Tripoli, but also had a presence at Zahlé in the Beqaa Valley, at the south in the Iqlim al-Kharrub, the Aley District and the Jabal Amel, where their local militants – after merging with other Christian, Shia Muslim and Druze militias – played a key part in the formation on 21 October 1976 of the Israeli-backed informal "Army for the Defense of South Lebanon" or ADSL (French: Armée de Défense du Liban-Sud or ADLS), later to become known as the "Free Lebanese Army" (FLA), the predecessor of the South Lebanon Army (SLA).

Weapons and equipment
The Tigers received covert support not only from the Lebanese Army in the pre-war years, but also from the United States, Iran, Jordan and Egypt since 1973, followed by Israel and Syria in 1976–77, who provided weapons and heavy equipment.  In addition, the collapse of the Lebanese Armed Forces (LAF) and the Internal Security Forces (ISF) in January 1976, coupled by the massive influx of Israeli military aid, allowed NLP militia units to re-equip themselves with modern small-arms, sophisticated mobile communications equipment, and military vehicles seized from LAF barracks and ISF Police stations or supplied by the Israelis. Additional weapons and other military equipments were procured in the international black market.

Small arms
Tigers' militiamen were provided with a variety of small arms, including Mauser Karabiner 98k, Lee-Enfield and MAS-36 bolt-action rifles, Carl Gustaf m/45, MAT-49 and PPSh-41 submachine guns, M2 and SIG SG 543 carbines, MAS-49, M1 Garand (or its Italian-produced copy, the Beretta Model 1952), Vz. 52, SKS, Beretta BM 59 and M14 semi-automatic rifles, Heckler & Koch G3, FN FAL (variants included the Israeli-produced 'lightened' ROMAT), M16A1, SIG SG 542, Vz. 58, AK-47 and AKM assault rifles (other variants included the Zastava M70, Chinese Type 56, Romanian Pistol Mitralieră model 1963/1965, Bulgarian AKK/AKKS and former East German MPi-KMS-72 assault rifles). Several models of handguns were used, including Smith & Wesson Model 10, Smith & Wesson Model 13, Smith & Wesson Model 14, Smith & Wesson Model 15, Smith & Wesson Model 17 and Smith & Wesson Model 19 revolvers, Colt M1911A1, Tokarev TT-33, CZ 75, FN P35 and MAB PA-15 pistols.

Squad weapons consisted of Chatellerault FM Mle 1924/29, Bren Mk. I .303 (7.7mm), MG 34, MG 42, Heckler & Koch HK21, AA-52, RPD, RPK and FN MAG light machine guns, with heavier Besa Mark III 7.92mm, Browning M1919A4 .30 Cal, Browning M2HB .50 Cal, SG-43/SGM Goryunov and DShKM machine guns being employed as platoon and company weapons. Grenade launchers and portable anti-tank weapons comprised M203 grenade launchers, 88.9mm Instalaza M65, RL-83 Blindicide, M72 LAW, RPG-2 and RPG-7 rocket launchers, whilst crew-served and indirect fire weapons included M2 60mm mortars, 82-PM-41 82mm mortars and 120-PM-38 (M-1938) 120mm heavy mortars, plus B-10 82mm, B-11 107mm and M40A1 106mm recoilless rifles (often mounted on technicals).

Armoured and transport vehicles
The Tigers' own armoured corps was created in early 1976, equipped with an assortment of ex-Lebanese Army M41A3 Walker Bulldog and AMX-13 light tanks, Charioteer tanks, M42 Duster SPAAGs, M113 and Panhard M3 VTT Armoured personnel carriers, Bravia V-200 Chaimite armoured cars, Staghound armoured cars, and Panhard AML-90 armoured cars, bolstered by twenty Israeli-supplied M50 Super Sherman Tanks, M3/M9 Zahlam half-tracks and BTR-152 APCs, later joined by two M41A3 light tanks captured from the Lebanese Arab Army in July 1976.

The NLP militia also raised a mechanized force of gun trucks and 'technicals', comprising M151A1 utility trucks, VIASA MB-CJ6 and Willys M38A1 MD jeeps (or its civilian version, the Jeep CJ-5), UAZ-469, Land-Rover series II-III, Santana Series III (Spanish-produced version of the Land-Rover long wheelbase series III), Morattab Series IV (Iranian-produced unlicensed version of the Land-Rover long wheelbase series III), Toyota Land Cruiser (J40), Toyota Land Cruiser (J45), Peugeot 404, Dodge Power Wagon W200, Dodge D series (3rd generation), GMC Sierra Custom K25/K30, Chevrolet C-10/C-15 Cheyenne and Chevrolet C-20 Scottsdale light pickups, and Toyota Dyna U10-series trucks armed with heavy machine guns, recoilless rifles, and anti-aircraft autocannons.  For logistical support, the Tigers relied on Range Rover 1st generation and Toyota Land Cruiser (J42) hardtop light pickups, Toyota U10-series route vans (minibus), Chevrolet C-50 medium-duty, Dodge F600 medium-duty, GMC C4500 medium-duty trucks and GMC C7500 heavy-duty cargo trucks; a number of Volkswagen Type 2 Transporter minibuses were used as military ambulances.

Artillery
They also fielded a powerful artillery corps equipped with British QF Mk III 25-Pounder field guns, French Mle 1950 BF-50 155mm howitzers, Soviet M1954 (M-46) 130mm towed field guns, Soviet AZP S-60 57mm anti-aircraft guns, British Bofors 40mm L/60 anti-aircraft guns and anti-aircraft autocannons. The latter consisted of Yugoslav Zastava M55 20mm triple-barreled, Soviet ZPU (ZPU-1, ZPU-2, ZPU-4) 14.5mm and ZU-23-2 23mm AA autocannons (mostly mounted on technicals and transport trucks), which were employed in both air defense and direct fire supporting roles.

Illegal activities and controversy
Financing for the NLP Tigers' came at first from both Chamoun's personal fortune and from protection rackets collected in the areas under their control, though they also received outside support.  Conservative Arab countries such as Jordan provided covert funding, weapons, ammunition, training and other non-lethal assistance.  Most of it entered towards the illegal ports of Tabarja and Dbayeh, both located north of Beirut in the Keserwan District, set up in early 1976 and administered by Joseph Abboud, former personal chauffeur and hunting partner of Camille Chamoun, who run drug-smuggling and arms contraband activities on the behalf of the NLP until 1980, when the Lebanese Forces brought the ports under their control. The NLP and its military wing did edit their own official newspaper, "The Battles" (Arabic: Ma'arik), but they never set up a radio or television service.

Ruthless fighters with a reputation of aggressiveness, often initiating hostilities with the opposition side, aggravated by lack of discipline and restraint, they were involved in several acts of sectarian violence. On December 16, 1975 despite a ceasefire called the previous day, the NLP Tigers forcibly displaced all the 450 residents of Sebnay, a Muslim village southeast of Beirut, in the predominantly Maronite neighborhood of Hadath, Baabda District.

In July–August 1976 they participated in the Karantina, Al-Masklah and Tel al-Zaatar Massacres of Palestinian refugees in East Beirut and Dbayeh, allied with the Army of Free Lebanon, Al-Tanzim, Kataeb Regulatory Forces, Lebanese Youth Movement and the Guardians of the Cedars.
  
Towards the end of the 1970s, however, rivalries within the Lebanese Front coalition strained the relationship between the NLP Tigers' and their erstwhile Christian allies, leading them to violent confrontation with the Phalangists and the Guardians of the Cedars. The Tigers' even battled these two factions in May 1979 for control of the Furn esh Shebbak and Ain El Remmaneh districts in Beirut, and for the town of Akoura in the Byblos District.

List of NLP Tigers commanders
 Naim Berdkan (October 1968 – January 1976)
 Dany Chamoun (January 1976 – July 1980)
 Dory Chamoun (July–August 1980)

NLP Tigers junior commanders
 Freddy Nasrallah 
 Bob Azzam™
 Dr Naji Hayek
 Georges Araj
 Elias El-Hannouche (الحنش)
 Nouhad Chelhot
 Jean Eid
 Nabil Nassif
 Toufic Nehme (a.k.a. 'Abou Antoun')

The Tigers in the Lebanese civil war

Early expansion phase 1975–1977
Upon the outbreak of the civil war in April 1975, the NLP Tigers immediately engaged the leftist Lebanese National Movement (LNM) militias and their Palestinian PLO allies, being heavily committed in several battles in and outside the Beirut area. In October 1975, they supported their Phalangist allies of the Kataeb Regulatory Forces (KRF) militia against the Al-Mourabitoun and the Nasserite Correctionist Movement (NCM) for the control of the Hotels district in centre Beirut.

In January 1976 the collapse of the Lebanese Armed Forces (LAF) enabled the Tigers to take over Army barracks and depots located at Achrafieh, Ain El Remmaneh, Hadath, Baabda, and Hazmiyeh districts of East Beirut, seizing heavy weapons and enrolling defectors into their ranks. The Tigers later joined in March that year the allied Christian Lebanese Front militias in the defense of the Mount Lebanon region and the Aley District against the combined LNM-PLO-Lebanese Arab Army (LAA) 'Spring Offensive'. During the Hundred Days' War in February 1978 the Tigers, backed by the Tyous Team of Commandos (TTC), put a spirited defence of the Achrafieh and Fayadieh districts in support of the Army of Free Lebanon (AFL) against the Syrian Army.

Reversals and decline 1978–1980 
The Tigers' involvement in these campaigns, however, cost them the loss of the Iqlim al-Kharrub to the LNM-PLO alliance supported by Palestine Liberation Army units on 20–22 January 1976, which they failed to defend despite being backed by ISF units and Lebanese Army troops. The fall of this important stronghold was a severe blow to the NLP and the Tigers (coupled by the death in action of their commander Naim Berdkan), depriving them of their main recruiting area along with their local training infrastructure, chiefly the Es-Saadiyat camp, and the port towns of Damour and Jiyeh.

Relations between the NLP political board and the Tigers' military command soured after the former, headed by Camille Chamoun, supported Syria's military intervention in June that year whereas the latter, now led by Camille's son Dany Chamoun, opposed it. Fearing that its own party's militia was getting out of his control, Camille tacitly allowed its Kataeb rivals to absorb the Tigers' into the Lebanese Forces (LF) under Bachir Gemayel. Dany's adamant refusal of allowing the Tigers to be incorporated led to a Phalangist assault on his militia's headquarters in Safra on July 7, 1980, which resulted in a massacre that claimed up to 500 lives, including civilians and 80 of Dany's men (other source states that the dead toll amounted to 150 Tigers' fighters).

While their leader Dany was rushed to exile, first to Syria and then to Europe after handling over the command of the Tigers to his elder brother Dory Chamoun, the militia was officially disbanded on Camille's orders in late August. Soon afterwards, the Phalangists seized nearly all of the Tigers' positions in and outside East Beirut, including the vital Naas and Adma training camps.  The remaining 3,000 or so militiamen either surrendered their weapons to the Lebanese Army or the Lebanese Forces and returned home or found themselves being consolidated by the end of October of that year into the Damouri Brigade within the LF.

Revival and disbandment 1983–1990 
The Israeli invasion of Lebanon in June 1982, coupled by the death of the LF supremo Bachir Gemayel in September that year brought the resurgence of the National Liberals into the political scene, although the efforts by Camille Chamoun to revive the Tigers militia in 1983–84 proved less successful. The small force of only 100 or so lightly equipped fighters they gathered proved incapable of competing with the Lebanese Forces' military might, being relegated to the role of a mere bodyguard for the NLP political leaders for the remainer of the war.

Upon the end of the civilian strife in October 1990 and the subsequent assassination of Dany Chamoun – who had succeeded his late father at the NLP's presidency in October 1987 – the last remaining National Liberals' paramilitary organization was disarmed on orders of the new Lebanese government.  The NLP Tigers are no longer active.

The Free Tigers
The Free Tigers (Arabic: نومور الحر | Noumour Al-Horr) or Lionceaux Libres in French, also known variously as the "Hannache Group", "Hannache's Tigers" or "Lionceaux d'Hannache", were a dissident splinter group of the NLP Tigers formed soon after the forcible merger of the latter into the Lebanese Forces in July 1980. Defying the official orders to disband, about 200 Tigers' militiamen commanded by Elias El-Hannouche (nom de guerre 'Hannache') went underground to wage a guerrilla war against the LF, operating in the Hadath and Ain El Remmaneh districts of East Beirut from August to late October 1980.  The Free Tigers are believed to have been responsible for some bomb and guerrilla attacks in East Beirut, including an ambush with combined rocket- and small-arms' fire on the U.S. ambassador's motorcade in August that year (intended to discredit the LF), followed on 10 November by two car-bomb explosions on the Achrafieh quarter that left 10 dead and 62 wounded.

Defeated after a four-day street battle despite being backed by Lebanese Army troops sent upon request of the NLP president Camille Chamoun and forced out in mid-November of their last remaining strongholds at Ain El Rammaneh by the LF, Hannache and a number of its dissident Tigers fled across the Green Line into the Muslim-controlled western sector of the Lebanese Capital. There they placed themselves under the protection of the Palestinian Fatah intelligence service before moving to the Syrian-controlled Beqaa Valley.

Believed to have become an agent of the Syrian regime, Hannache instigated the Battle of Zahleh by deliberately provoking the LF militia forces defending the Greek-Catholic town of Zahlé to engage in a gunfight, so that the Syrian troops would become involved. On 14 December 1980, Hannache and 50 Free Tigers' militiamen stormed and seized the Hoch el-Oumara suburb of Zahlé, before being driven out by local LF units the following day; the Free Tigers returned to Zahlé on December 20 and managed to seize by force the former NLP party offices' but they were resisted by the LF and subsequently forced to withdraw from the town on December 22 under Syrian Army protection. The Free Tigers seemed to have remained operational until 1981, though very little was heard from them afterwards.

Legacy
Since 2002, several former NLP Tigers' commanders known for their right-wing, nationalist leanings, rallied in support of General Michel Aoun and went on to occupy various key positions within the Aounist Free Patriotic Movement (FPM) hierarchy, ranging from political (Dr Naji Hayek and Georges Aaraj) to security (Jean Eid). In 2015 Jean Eid, Georges Aaraj, Nabil Nassif and others started a new organization named Al-Noumour, trying to rally what is left of the Tigers' legacy. They remain staunch supporters of President Michel Aoun.

See also 
 Damour massacre
 Lebanese Civil War
 Lebanese Forces
 Lebanese Front
 List of weapons of the Lebanese Civil War
 National Liberal Party (Lebanon)
 People's Liberation Army (Lebanon)
 Phoenicianism
 Safra massacre
 South Lebanon Army
 Tyous Team of Commandos
 Zahliote Group

Citations

General references 

 Afaf Sabeh McGowan, John Roberts, As'ad Abu Khalil, and Robert Scott Mason, Lebanon: a country study, area handbook series, Headquarters, Department of the Army (DA Pam 550-24), Washington D.C. 1989.
 Alain Menargues, Les Secrets de la guerre du Liban: Du coup d'état de Béchir Gémayel aux massacres des camps palestiniens , Albin Michel, Paris 2004. .
Barry Rubin (editor), Lebanon: Liberation, Conflict, and Crisis, Middle East in Focus, Palgrave Macmillan, London 2009.  – 
 Beate Hamizrachi, The Emergence of South Lebanon Security Belt, Praeger Publishers Inc., New York 1984. 
 Boutros Labaki & Khalil Abou Rjeily, Bilan des guerres du Liban (1975-1990) , Collection "Comprendre le Moyen-Orient", Éditions L'Harmattan, Paris 1993. .
 Claire Hoy and Victor Ostrovsky, By Way of Deception: The Making and Unmaking of a Mossad Officer, St. Martin's Press, New York 1990. 
 Dan Bavly & Eliahu Salpeter, Fire in Beirut: Israel's War in Lebanon with the PLO, Stein & Day, New York 1984. 
 Denise Ammoun, Histoire du Liban contemporain: Tome 2 1943-1990 , Éditions Fayard, Paris 2005. .
 Edgar O'Ballance, Civil War in Lebanon, 1975-92, Palgrave Macmillan, London 1998. 
 Farid El-Kazen, The Breakdown of the State in Lebanon 1967–1976, I.B. Tauris, London 2000. 
 Fawwaz Traboulsi, Identités et solidarités croisées dans les conflits du Liban contemporain; "Chapitre 12: L'économie politique des milices: le phénomène mafieux" , Thèse de Doctorat d'Histoire – 1993, Université de Paris VIII, 2007.
 Fawwaz Traboulsi, A History of Modern Lebanon: Second Edition, Pluto Press, London 2012. 
 Itamar Rabinovich,  The War for Lebanon, 1970-1985, Cornell University Press, Ithaca and London 1989 (revised edition). .
 Jennifer Philippa Eggert, Female Fighters and Militants During the Lebanese Civil War: Individual Profiles, Pathways, and Motivations, Studies in Conflict & Terrorism, Taylor & Francis Group, LLC, 2018. .
 Jonathan Randall, The Tragedy of Lebanon: Christian Warlords, Israeli Adventurers, and American Bunglers, Just World Books, Charlottesville, Virginia 2012. .
 Joseph A. Kechichian, The Lebanese Army: Capabilities and Challenges in the 1980s, Conflict Quarterly, Winter 1985.
 Joseph Hokayem, L'armée libanaise pendant la guerre: un instrument du pouvoir du président de la République (1975-1985) , Lulu.com, Beyrouth 2012. .
Kamal Suleiman Salibi, Crossroads to Civil War: Lebanon 1958-1976, Caravan Books Inc., New York 2005 (3rd edition).  
Makram Rabah, Conflict on Mount Lebanon: The Druze, the Maronites and Collective Memory, Alternative Histories, Edinburgh University Press, 2020 (1st edition). 
 Marius Deeb, The Lebanese Civil War, Praeger Publishers Inc., New York 1980. 
 Matthew S. Gordon, The Gemayels (World Leaders Past & Present), Chelsea House Publishers, 1988. 
 Paul Jureidini, R. D. McLaurin, and James Price, Military operations in selected Lebanese built-up areas, 1975-1978, Aberdeen, MD: U.S. Army Human Engineering Laboratory, Aberdeen Proving Ground, Technical Memorandum 11–79, June 1979.
 R. D. Mclaurin, The battle of Zahle, Aberdeen, MD: U.S. Army Human Engineering Laboratory, Aberdeen Proving Ground, Technical memorandum 8-86, 1986.
 Rex Brynen, Sanctuary and Survival: the PLO in Lebanon, Boulder: Westview Press, Oxford 1990.  – 
 Robert Fisk, Pity the Nation: Lebanon at War, London: Oxford University Press, (3rd ed. 2001). .
 Samir Kassir, La Guerre du Liban: De la dissension nationale au conflit régional , Éditions Karthala/CERMOC, Paris, 1994. .
 Samuel M. Katz, Lee E. Russel, and Ron Volstad, Armies in Lebanon 1982-84, Men-at-arms series 165, Osprey Publishing Ltd, London ,1985. .
 Samuel M. Katz and Ron Volstad, Arab Armies of the Middle East Wars 2, Men-at-arms series 194, Osprey Publishing Ltd, London, 1988. .
 Samir Makdisi and Richard Sadaka, The Lebanese Civil War, 1975-1990, American University of Beirut, Institute of Financial Economics, Lecture and Working Paper Series (2003 No.3), pp. 1–53.
 Thomas Collelo (ed.), Lebanon: a country study, Library of Congress, Federal Research Division, Headquarters, Department of the Army (DA Pam 550-24), Washington D.C., December 1987 (Third edition 1989). 
 Tony Badran (Barry Rubin ed.), Lebanon: Liberation, Conflict, and Crisis, Palgrave Macmillan, London 2010. .
Ze'ev Schiff and Ehud Ya'ari, Israel's Lebanon War, Simon and Schuster, New York 1985.  –

Background sources

 Chris McNab, Soviet Submachine Guns of World War II: PPD-40, PPSh-41 and PPS, Weapon series 33, Osprey Publishing Ltd, Oxford 2014. .
 Gordon L. Rottman, US Grenade Launchers – M79, M203, and M320, Weapon series 57, Osprey Publishing Ltd, Oxford 2017. .
 Leroy Thompson, The G3 Battle Rifle, Weapon series 68, Osprey Publishing Ltd, Oxford 2019. .
 Jean Huon, Un Siècle d'Armement Mondial: Armes à feu d'infanterie de petit calibre, tome 4 , Crépin-Leblond éditions, Chaumont 1981. .
 Leigh Neville, Technicals: Non-Standard Tactical Vehicles from the Great Toyota War to modern Special Forces, New Vanguard series 257, Osprey Publishing Ltd, Oxford 2018. 
 Moustafa El-Assad, Civil Wars Volume 1: The Gun Trucks, Blue Steel books, Sidon 2008. .
 Samer Kassis, 30 Years of Military Vehicles in Lebanon, Beirut: Elite Group, 2003. .
 Samer Kassis, Véhicules Militaires au Liban/Military Vehicles in Lebanon 1975-1981, Trebia Publishing, Chyah 2012. .
 William W. Harris, Faces of Lebanon: Sects, Wars, and Global Extensions, Princeton Series on the Middle East, Markus Wiener Publishers, Princeton 1997. .
 Zachary Sex & Bassel Abi-Chahine, Modern Conflicts 2: The Lebanese Civil War, from 1975 to 1991 and Beyond, Modern Conflicts Profile Guide Volume II, AK Interactive, 2021. ISBN 8435568306073

External links
 NLP Tigers official site
 
 Noumours militia video clips
 NLP Tigers M42 Duster SPAAG and AMX-13 tank at Tel al-Zaatar
 Histoire militaire de l'armée libanaise de 1975 à 1990 

Factions in the Lebanese Civil War
Lebanese factions allied with Israel
Lebanese Front
Lebanese nationalism
Military wings of nationalist parties